Cheryl Lynn Johnson (born May 8, 1960) is an American government official who has served as the 36th Clerk of the United States House of Representatives since February 26, 2019. Between January 3, 2023, and January 7, 2023, Johnson served as the acting presiding officer of the House while the election of a speaker for the 118th United States Congress was deadlocked until Kevin McCarthy was elected after 15 ballots.

Early life and education
Johnson was born in New Orleans, Louisiana, to Reverend Charlie and Cynthia Davis.

Johnson graduated from the University of Iowa with a bachelor's degree in journalism and mass communication in 1980. She earned her J.D. degree from the Howard University School of Law in 1984. She is a graduate of the senior management program at the Harvard Kennedy School.

Career
Johnson served as director and counsel for the Committee on House Administration's Subcommittee on Libraries and Memorials, House Committee on Post Office, and Civil Service Subcommittee on Investigations. She worked with the Subcommittee chair, Bill Clay, to exercise oversight and legislative responsibility over the Library of Congress and the Smithsonian Institution.

Johnson served as the chief education and investigative counsel for the House Committee on Education and the Workforce. She was the principal policy advisor and spokesperson for the Committee. She primarily focused on elementary and secondary education issues, juvenile justice, child nutrition, labor issues, and older Americans' employment and nutrition programs.

After nearly twenty years in the House of Representatives, Johnson went on to serve in  the Smithsonian Institution's Office of Government Relations for ten years, serving one of those years as director.

Clerk of the U.S. House of Representatives
In late December 2018, Speaker-designate Nancy Pelosi named Johnson  as her choice for the next Clerk of the U.S. House of Representatives, becoming the second African American to serve in the post after Lorraine C. Miller. On February 25, 2019 Johnson was sworn as the 36th Clerk and assumed the role on February 26, 2019. She was preceded by Karen L. Haas.

On January 3, 2023, Johnson presided over the first session of the 118th United States Congress until January 7, 2023, making her the first African American woman and person of color to wield the gavel for the U.S. House of Representatives. After fourteen failed attempts to elect a Speaker, her presiding role ended after Representative Kevin McCarthy was elected the 55th Speaker of the House in the 15th ballot. 

Johnson also served as Clerk during the 116th United States Congress (2019–2021) and 117th United States Congress (2021–2023). She was most recently selected to serve as Clerk during the 118th United States Congress (since 2023).

Personal life
Johnson lives in Chevy Chase, Maryland, with her husband, Clarence Ellison, and their son.

She is a member of the District of Columbia and the Louisiana bars. She serves on the board of the Nineteenth Street Baptist Church and the Faith and Politics Institute.

References

External links
 
 

1960 births
Living people
American lobbyists
Clerks of the United States House of Representatives
Lawyers from New Orleans
Lawyers from Washington, D.C.
University of Iowa alumni
Howard University School of Law alumni
Date of birth missing (living people)
21st-century African-American women
People from Chevy Chase, Maryland
African-American government officials
Smithsonian Institution people